SS Telena was a British merchant ship that was torpedoed and sunk in the Atlantic Ocean  west north west of the Fastnet Rock by German submarine  on 21 April 1917. Her crew survived. She was en route from Philadelphia to Queenstown, with a cargo of benzine.

She was built in 1895 by William Gray & Company of West Hartlepool, she was initially operated by Marcus Samuel & Company, London, the forerunner of Shell Transport & Trading, to which company Telena was transferred on its restructuring in 1898. She was transferred to the subsidiary company Anglo-Saxon Petroleum when it took over Shell's shipping assets in 1907. Both ships were damaged with Powatan beached with ship and cargo a total loss. Court findings were that Powhatan, in confused signals, had cut across Telenas course rather than pass port to port with the responsibility for the collision resting entirely with Powhatan. On appeal of that decision the Fourth Circuit Court of Appeals dismissed the case and found it "unnecessary to add anything to the full and fair discussion" of the case in the lower court. Powhatan was later salvaged and returned to service as SS Cuba.

Citations

Bibliography

 
 
 

Maritime incidents in 1917
Steamships of the United Kingdom
Merchant ships of the United Kingdom
1895 ships
Ships of Anglo-Saxon Petroleum
World War I shipwrecks in the Atlantic Ocean
Ships built on the River Tees
Ships sunk by German submarines in World War I